Honky-Tonk Stardust Cowboy is the second studio album by the singer-songwriter Jonathan Edwards, released in 1972.

The album peaked at #167 on the Billboard 200 album chart.

Critical reception
AllMusic called the album "just as strong musically" as the debut, writing that it is "more laid-back, with a sound and delivery reminiscent of the well-crafted material on Dillard & Clark's The Fantastic Expedition of Dillard & Clark and Through the Morning, Through the Night."

Track listing
All tracks composed by Jonathan Edwards; except where indicated
  "Stop and Start It All Again"
  "Everything"
  "Longest Ride"
  "Give Us a Song"
  "Dues Days Bar"
  "Morning Train" (Traditional; arranged by Elena Mezzetti)
  "Ballad of Upsy Daisy" (Joe Dolce)
  "It's a Beautiful Day"
  "Sugar Babe" (Jesse Colin Young)
  "Dream Song"
  "Paper Doll" (Johnny S. Black)
  "Honky-Tonk Stardust Cowboy" (Darrell Statler)
  "That's What Our Life Is"

Personnel
 Jonathan Edwards – vocals, guitar, harmonica, mandolin; bass on "That's What Our Life Is"
 Eric Lilljequist – lead guitar, harmony vocals
 Bill Keith – steel guitar, banjo
 Stuart Schulman – bass guitar, piano, string arrangements
 Richard Adelman – drums
 Dean Adrien – conga drum
Chandler Travis – maracas
 Elena Mezzetti – arrangement on "Morning Train"
Technical
Bob Runstein, Dave Palmer - engineer
Kristine Weaver - photography

References

1972 albums
Atco Records albums
Jonathan Edwards (musician) albums